Nacer Bouiche (born 16 May 1963) is an Algerian footballer. He played in eleven matches for the Algeria national football team in 1986 and 1992. He was also named in Algeria's squad for the 1986 African Cup of Nations tournament.

References

External links
 

1963 births
Living people
Algerian footballers
Algeria international footballers
1986 African Cup of Nations players
1990 African Cup of Nations players
1992 African Cup of Nations players
Africa Cup of Nations-winning players
Competitors at the 1987 Mediterranean Games
Mediterranean Games competitors for Algeria
Footballers from Algiers
Association football forwards
21st-century Algerian people
20th-century Algerian people
CR Belouizdad players
JS Kabylie players
Ferencvárosi TC footballers
Red Star F.C. players
Paris FC players
Qatar SC players
Algerian expatriate footballers
Expatriate footballers in France
Expatriate footballers in Hungary
Expatriate footballers in Qatar